The 1997–98 Australian Athletics Championships was the 76th edition of the national championship in outdoor track and field for Australia. It was held from 13–15 March 1998 at the Olympic Park Stadium in Melbourne. It served as a selection meeting for Australia at the 1998 Commonwealth Games. The 10,000 metres event took place separately at the Zatopek 10K on 18 December 1997 at Lakeside Stadium in Melbourne. The combined track and field events were held at the Hobart Grand Prix from 20–22 February 1998.

Medal summary

Men

Women

References

External links 
 Athletics Australia website

1998
Australian Athletics Championships
Australian Championships
Athletics Championships
Sports competitions in Melbourne
1990s in Melbourne